Les Innocents is a French rock and pop duet consisting of Jean-Philippe Nataf (nicknamed Jipé, vocals, guitar) and Jean-Christophe Urbain (nicknamed Jean-Chri, vocals, guitar, keyboards) from 1982 to 1999 and 2013 onwards. Former members include Michael Rushton (drums), Bernard Viguie (bass), Rico (bass) and Pierre Morin (drums).

Biography
The band was founded in 1982 in Lille and had their initial success with the single "Jodie" (1987), and their first album Cent Mètres au Paradis (1989). In 1992 they produced their album Fous à lier, which became their first major success. "L'Autre Finistère", the main single of the album, was extensively played by French radios in 1992. The next album, Post Partum, confirmed their talent and popularity, and took them to the peak of their fame. "Colore" was one of the most aired singles of 1996.

They released a self-titled album in 1999, which ultimately led to their separation in 2000, in part because of lukewarm sales, as well as some internal musical differences. JP Nataf continued a solo career, while Jean-Christophe Urbain focused on producing and writing for other artists. The pair eventually met again in 2003 for the release of their best of named "Meilleurs Souvenirs".

Jean-Philippe Nataf and Jean-Christophe Urbain are close friends of the singer Jil Caplan, with whom they have worked. Jean-Christophe Urbain eventually became her life partner.

The duet reformed in 2013 and have been performing small concerts on a regular basis since then. They eventually recorded a new album, named "Mandarine", released in 2015.

Members
 from 1982 to June 1988: JP Nataf (Jipé), Rico, Bertrand Sansonetti (Tramber), Pierre Morin
 from June 1988 to 1990: JP Nataf (Jipé), Rico, Jean-Christophe Urbain (Jean-Chri)
 from 1990 to 1995: JP Nataf (Jipé), Rico, Jean-Christophe Urbain (Jean-Chri), Michael Rushton
 from 1996 to 1999: JP Nataf (Jipé), Jean-Christophe Urbain (Jean-Chri), Michael Rushton, Bernard Viguié, Christopher Board.
 after 2013: JP Nataf (Jipé), Jean-Christophe Urbain (Jean-Chri).
 Bertrand Sansonetti has released one album in 1991, Saint-Lazare, in which features Le carrousel.
 Pierre Morin has released two albums: La Fidélité mon amour in 1991 and Free Vol in 1995.

Discography

Studio albums
 Cent Mètres Au Paradis (1989)
 Fous à lier (1992)
 Post-Partum (1995)
 Les Innocents (1999)
 Mandarine (2015)
 6 1/2 (2019)

Compilation
 Meilleurs Souvenirs (2003)

Singles and EPs
With peak positions in French SNEP Singles Chart:

 "Pamela" (1985)
 "Jodie" (1987) - #34
 "Et le Temps n'attend pas" (1988)
 "Les Innocents chantent Noël" (1989)
 "Miss Monde pleure" (1990)
 "Mon Dernier Soldat" (1991)
 "L'Autre Finistère" (1992) - #10
 "Un Homme extraordinaire" (1993) - #27
 "Fous à lier" (1993)
 "Je vais à Bang Bang" (1993)
 "Un Monde parfait" (1995)
 "Colore" (1996) - #31
 "Des jours adverses" (1996)
 "Dentelle" (1996)
 "Raide raide raide" (1997)
 "Le Cygne" (1999)
 "Danny Wilde" (2000)
 "Une Vie moins ordinaire" (2000)
 "Un Homme extraordinaire" (2013) - #125
 "Les philharmonies martiennes" (2015)
 "Love qui peut" (2015)

References

French rock music groups
Musical groups established in 1982
Musical groups disestablished in 1999
1982 establishments in France
Musical groups from Hauts-de-France